Passiflora guatemalensis,  the Guatemala passion vine, is a species in the family Passifloraceae.   It is native to Guatemala, and found from southern Mexico through Central America to Venezuela.

Passiflora guatemalensis is a species that can grow large, has purple undersides on the 'decorative' leaves, and white flowers.  It is planted in conservatories and subtropical gardens.

References

guatemalensis
Flora of Guatemala
Flora of Central America
Flora of the Yucatán Peninsula
Flora of northern South America
Flora of Belize
Flora of Costa Rica
Flora of Panama
Flora of Quintana Roo
Flora of Tabasco
Flora of Venezuela
Garden plants of Central America
Garden plants of North America
Garden plants of South America
Vines